Nicole Claveloux (born June 23, 1940) is a French painter, illustrator and comic book artist.

Biography
She was born in Saint-Étienne and studied fine arts there. She moved to Paris in 1966, where she worked as an illustrator and comics artist for various magazines including Planète,  and Marie Claire.

Her illustration style incorporates both psychedelic use of colour and sophisticated black and white images.

Her work was included in several exhibitions, including Nicole Claveloux et compagnie at Villeurbanne in 1995 and a retrospective at the Mediatheque Hermeland at Saint-Herblain.

Selected works 
 Le Voyage extravagant de Hugo Brisefer (1967)
 Alala: Les télémorphoses (1970), illustrator. Published by Harlin Quist in English as The Teletrips of Alala
 Les Aventures d'Alice au pays des merveilles (1972), illustrator
 La Main verte (1978), comic book featuring a series of short stories from Métal Hurlant. Published in English in 2017 as The Green Hand
 Double assassinat dans la rue Morgue (1981), illustrator
 Alboum (1998), illustrator, text by  received the Prix Sorcières
 Morceaux choisis de la Belle et la Bête, erotic book (2003), illustrator
 Mon Gugus à moi (2004), illustrator, received the 
 Un roi, une princesse et une pieuvre (2005), illustrator, received the Prix Goncourt Jeunesse
 Professeur Totem et docteur Tabou (2006), illustrator
 Gargantua (2007), illustrator
 Confessions d'un monte-en-l'air, erotic book (2007), illustrator
 Contes de la Fève et du Gland, erotic book (2010), illustrator
 La Belle et la bête, children's book (2013), illustrator
 Nours, children's book (2014), illustrator
 Quel genre de bisous ?, children's book (2016)
 The Green Hand and Other Stories (2017), with Édith Zha, translated into English by Donald Nicholson-Smith

References

External links 
 

1940 births
Living people
French illustrators
French comics artists